Daisuke Kamada (鎌田大祐, Daisuke Kamada, born December 25, 1981) is a Japanese fashion model for Dior, Givenchy and Calvin Klein.

He has participated in events such as New York Fashion Week, Tokyo, Paris, Singapore and various emblematic cities around the world.

Early life 
Born and brought up in Japan, Daisuke Kamada is a Japanese proficient model scouted at the age of 14. He walked runaway shows at fashion week events in Portland.

Career 
Despite the fact that male models do not receive much attention in Japan compared to female models, causing very few to consider making a living from this profession, Kamada has made inroads with effort and dedication.

He walked in the New York Fashion Week in 2002 at the age of 21, Madrid Fashion Week, Spain in 2008, Portland Fashion week in 2012, and Mercedes Benz Fashion Week in 2017.

Her career in the fashion industry has allowed her to work for major brands such as Calvin Klein, Kenzo, Dior, Givenchy, Comme Des Garcons, Fendi, ISAORA, Asahi Beer Dries Cool, Georgia/NOMEL's Dism, Prima Vista, Scalp D Shampoo, Maison Francis Kurjan, Braun (Series 9 Pro) and many other brands.

In 2018, he was listed in the top 10 Japanese male influencers of the year by Japan Buzz magazine.

In April 2021, he appeared in the official media of the Coca-Cola Company as the face of the brand, which meant great positioning for him.

Since she was 18 years old, she started her own business and has served as the president of her own company Chiisana Suisei Co, Ltd, which is now her own management office. He has launched multiple media projects as a producer.

Discography

Studio albums 
 2022: Producer Life

Singles 

 2022 City On Track
 2022 Kamada Life
 2023 Heart Vs Soul
 2023 Only 1 Life

References

External links

 

Japanese male models